Cicci Racing was an American professional stock car racing team that competed in the NASCAR Xfinity Series. The team is owned by Frank Cicci of Elmira, New York and was last driven by Jay Sauter.

Beginnings 
FCR first began racing as a short track team in Upstate New York. They won the Late Model division championship in 1985 at  Shangri-La Speedway  (later Tioga Motorsports Park before closing after 2005) That year, they made their NASCAR Busch Series debut at North Carolina Speedway, as the No. 67. Jimmy Spencer qualified 30th and finished 19th. They hired Spencer to race in NASCAR's National Modified Tour after that, and subsequently won the championship in that series in 1986 and 1987. During the 1987 season, Cicci and Spencer ran two more races in the Busch Series with Quick Stop Beverage sponsoring. They decided to run Busch full-time in 1988, the team being named Team 34 Racing. Despite not winning a race, Spencer had 13 top-ten finishes, and finished seventh in points that season. They began 1989 without major sponsorship, but Spencer was able to pick up his first career victory at Hickory Motor Speedway, then won two more races that season at Rougemount and Myrtle Beach. Suddenly, Cicci released Spencer to have Randy LaJoie drive the 34 for the rest of the season, who posted two top-ten finishes. Spencer returned to run a limited schedule in a second Cicci car, the Lowe's Foods No. 87 car, and had two top-ten finishes as well. He left for the Winston Cup Series at the end of the season.

Early 90s 
In 1990, FCR hired Clifford Allison to drive the Gwaltney Meats Buick. Allison struggled, however, and was released after the seventh race of the season. Jack Sprague took over for the balance of the season, and had a sixth-place finish at Orange County.

Still searching for competitiveness, Cicci teamed up with Jeffrey and Scott Welliver for 1991 and hired Todd Bodine to drive. Bodine rewarded them with a win at the Budweiser 200 and a seventh-place finish in points. The next season, armed with sponsor Hungry Jack, Bodine won three times and finished third in points. After switching to Chevrolets for 1993, Bodine won three more races but struggled with consistency, and finished 9th in points. He left for Butch Mock Motorsports at the end of the season. He was replaced by Mike McLaughlin, who had eight top-ten finishes in the Fiddle Faddle-sponsored car.

Prime years 
In 1995, French's Mustard became primary sponsor, and McLaughlin picked up his first career win at Dover International Speedway, and finished third in points. After a winless 1996, McLaughlin chalked up two more wins in 1997, and was named the Series' most popular driver. During the 1997 season, the team expanded to a multi-car operation, fielding the No. 36 Stanley Tools Pontiac Grand Prix for Bodine. He won one race and finished runner-up in the championship chase. Goulds Pumps was the team's new sponsor in 1998, and together they won two more races and finished 3rd in points. Bodine had left for Team Tabasco at the end of the season, and rookie driver Matt Hutter took his place. Despite posting one top-ten finish, Hutter was replaced mid-season by David Green, who put together seven top-five finishes. A third car appeared for Cicci-Welliver in 1998 as well, the No. 30 Slim Jim Chevy driven by Mike Cope. Cope struggled with consistency as well, and would be replaced by Bodine for the balance of the season.

The team changed its name to Cicci-Welliver Racing before the 1999 season. In 1999, Tim Fedewa took over the No. 36, and had 9 top-ten finishes and a 14th-place finish in points. Bodine continued driving the newly renumbered 66 Phillips Chevy and had ten top-fives. McLaughlin meanwhile decided he needed a change of scenery, and announced he was leaving the team for Innovative Motorsports, to the shock of the NASCAR community. David Green returned to take his place with AFG Glass as sponsor. He had eleven top-tens and a 9th in points. Fedewa picked up a win at New Hampshire, but failed to qualify twice and finished 18th in points. Bodine picked up one more victory and had a fourth-place finish in points.

Struggles and rebirth 
In 2001, Bodine left for Haas-Carter Motorsports, and Fedewa took his place in the 66. Consequently, Stanley was replaced by GNC, and Hank Parker Jr. took over the driving duties for the No. 36. Green stayed in the No. 34 and had six top-tens, but was not happy with the results and left. Parker picked up his first career win and finished 15th in points. Fedewa struggled with his new ride however, and would be released midway through the season. Geoffrey Bodine took over for the rest of the season, his best finish being a fourth at Richmond.

In 2002, the Wellivers pulled out of the team after a long association. Cicci sold the 36 and 66 teams to Wayne Jesel. Jimmy Spencer returned to the team as a partner, with the United States Air Force came aboard to sponsor the No. 34, which was to be driven by rookie Stuart Kirby on a part-time schedule. Kirby ran eight races, but did not finish higher than 17th, and he was replaced by Steve Grissom, who didn't fare any better than a 22nd-place run at Richmond. The next season, former National Football League quarterback Jim Kelly came on board as a partner to try to attract sponsors. They could only get LesCare Kitchens to run that season, on a part-time basis. McLaughlin returned after a prior deal had fallen through, and had one top-ten finish, but LesCare did not live up to their sponsorship obligations, causing Spencer to dissolve the partnership.

The team shut down after that, but returned in 2005 with Dollar General sponsoring the car, driven by Randy LaJoie. LaJoie had three top-ten finishes, but was replaced by Todd Bodine on occasion, and finished 19th in points. For 2006, Champ Car World Series driver Paul Tracy took the wheel for 5 races with SportClips and American Crew. Other drivers that drove the car included Bodine, Scott Lynch, Carlos Pardo, Kertus Davis, Mike Bliss, Jason Keller, Jeff Fuller and Kim Crosby.

For Frank Cicci Racing's 20th year in the Busch Series the team was set to run the full 2007 season with new driver Brian Conz, coming over from the ARCA RE/MAX Series, with Scottish Rite as the sponsor. After Steve Grissom drove at Daytona, it was reported that Cicci has placed Conz and his sponsor on notice for failing to pay its financial obligations. Jay Sauter was to drive the car for most of the 2007 season, but the team suspended operations in April. They attempted to run the Zippo 200 but could not come up with funds to do so.

References

External links 

Frank Cicci Racing
Cicci closes shop
Frank Cicci – NASCAR Owner
Jeffrey Welliver – NASCAR Owner
Scott Welliver – NASCAR Owner

Auto racing teams established in 1979
Sports clubs disestablished in 2007
Companies based in North Carolina
Defunct NASCAR teams
American auto racing teams
Defunct companies based in North Carolina
2007 disestablishments in North Carolina